Spitter may refer to:
 Spitter (river), a stream and waterfall in Thuringia, Germany
 Spitball, an illegal baseball pitch
Me and the Spitter, a book by Gaylord Perry about throwing the pitch
 Spitter, a person who has the habit of spitting
 Spitter, a person who places meat on a roasting spit
 Spitter, a fictional Dilophosaurus in Jurassic Park
 Spitter, a type of special infected from Left 4 Dead 2
 Spitter, a classification  of cider apple

See also
Spittoon, a receptacle for spitting